Qulanlu-ye Olya (also Romanized as Qūlānlū-ye ‘Olyā; also known as Qūlānlū-ye Bālā) is a village in Takmaran Rural District, Sarhad District, Shirvan County, North Khorasan Province, Iran. At the 2006 census, its population was 267, in 61 families.

References 

Populated places in Shirvan County